Dan McMillan (June 29, 1898 – October 22, 1975) was an American football player. McMillan was a prominent tackle for the USC Trojans football teams of the University of Southern California for two seasons until his sporting career was interrupted by service in the First World War. He later transferred to Cal where he was selected All-American in 1921. He is a member of the Cal Athletic Hall of Fame. He was elected to the College Football Hall of Fame in 1971.

References

External links
 

1898 births
1975 deaths
American football tackles
California Golden Bears football players
USC Trojans football players
All-American college football players
College Football Hall of Fame inductees
Players of American football from  Los Angeles